Little Accident is a 1939 American comedy film directed by Charles Lamont and written by Paul Yawitz and Eve Greene. It is very loosely based on the 1928 play Little Accident by Floyd Dell and Thomas Mitchell, mostly retaining just its title. The film stars Hugh Herbert, Florence Rice, Richard Carlson, Ernest Truex, Joy Hodges, Kathleen Howard, Howard Hickman, Edgar Kennedy, Etienne Girardot and Fritz Feld. The film was released on October 27, 1939, by Universal Pictures.

Plot
On the day before his second wedding, a man finds out that his bride-to-be has had a baby.

Cast
Hugh Herbert as Herbert Pearson
Florence Rice as Alice Pearson
Richard Carlson as Perry Allerton
Ernest Truex as Tabby Morgan
Joy Hodges as Joan Huston
Kathleen Howard as Mrs. Allerton
Howard Hickman as Mr. Allerton
Edgar Kennedy as Paper Hanger
Etienne Girardot as Professor Artemus Glenwater
Fritz Feld as Malisse
Charles D. Brown as Jeff Collins
Baby Sandy as Sandy

Critical reception 
Variety wrote that although the movie "displays cute smile and antics of Baby Sandy, combining some elemental and slapstick comedy sequences by Hugh Herbert and 
adult members of the cast, but all on a rather inconsequential story that serves nothing more than as an excuse for the individual situations and that "as an attraction, Little Accident will suffice as supporter in the family houses, lacking story strength to get attention above that slot."

References

External links
 

1939 films
American comedy films
1939 comedy films
Universal Pictures films
Films directed by Charles Lamont
American black-and-white films
1930s English-language films
1930s American films